The Medical University of Lublin dates back to 1944 in Lublin, Poland. The university gained its autonomy in 1950. Over the years, new departments were added such as the Department of Dentistry in 1973.

The university maintains lively international scientific contacts in cooperation with Hvidovre Hospital in Copenhagen, Denmark; Ziekenhuis-Tilburg Hospital (Netherlands), and Lviv Medical University in Ukraine, among others.

Faculties
 Faculty of Medicine       
 Faculty of Dentistry
 Faculty of Pharmacy

Notable people
Professor Tadeusz Krwawicz developed the first cryoprobe for intracapsular cataract extraction in 1961.

English Language Division
In 2001, the English Language Division of the medical faculty was formed. The division offers four-year and six-year M.D. programs in which students have the option of pursuing clinical clerkships in Poland or the United States following completion of the basic sciences portion in Poland.

Ranking

External links
 Medical University of Lublin (in Polish)
 Medical University of Lublin (in English)
 Sister school in Taiwan: Taipei Medical University

References

Educational institutions established in 1944
Lublin
Universities and colleges in Lublin
1944 establishments in Poland